Mahton is  a caste in India. According to W. H. McLeod, they are small in number and found mostly in the Doaba region, where some have converted to Sikhism. Although they claim to have descended from Rajputs, this belief is disputed by other communities.

References

Further reading 
 Guru Nanak journal of sociology. Other Creators Guru Nanak Dev University, Sociology Dept., Published Amritsar, India : Sociology Dept., Guru Nanak Dev University, 1980-
 The making of Little Punjab in Canada : patterns of immigration, Author: Archana B Verma Publisher: Thousand Oaks, Calif. : Sage Publications, 2002
 Punjabis in Canada : a study of formation of an ethnic community, Author: Paramjit S Judge, Publisher: Delhi Chanakya Publ. 1994

Indian castes
Social groups of Punjab, India
Sikh communities